Sennoye is a rural locality (a village) in Zlynkovsky District, Bryansk Oblast, Russia. The population was 2 as of 2013.

Geography 
Sennoye is located 36 km north of Zlynka (the district's administrative centre) by road. Dobrodeyevka is the nearest rural locality.

References 

Rural localities in Zlynkovsky District